Elizabeth Ammons Larsen was an American former First Lady of American Samoa and First Lady of Guam.

Early life 
On December 6, 1893, Larsen was born as Elizabeth Ammons in Denver, Colorado. Larsen's father was Elias M. Ammons, a Governor of Colorado. Larsen's mother was Elizabeth Fleming Ammons. Larsen attended Wolcott School, a school established by Anna Wolcott Vaile in 1898.

Education 
Ammons earned a degree from Colorado Women's College. Ammons attended University of Colorado and took courses in journalism.

Career 
In Colorado, Larsen became an accomplished equestrienne. 

In 1942, when Henry Louis Larsen was appointed by President Franklin D. Roosevelt as the first Military Governor of American Samoa, Larsen became the First Lady of American Samoa on January 12, 1942, until April 25, 1942. 

In 1944, when Henry Louis Larsen became the military Governor of Guam, Larsen became the First Lady of Guam on August 15, 1944, until May 30, 1946.

Personal life 
On Nov. 25, 1913, Larsen married Henry Louis Larsen, who later became a United States Marine Corps Lieutenant General and a military Governor of Guam. On October 2, 1962, Larsen's husband died of a heart attack in Denver, Colorado.  On July 23, 1990, Larsen died in Denver, Colorado. Larsen is interred at Arlington National Cemetery in Arlington County, Virginia.

References

External links 
 image of Miss Wolcott's School Denver in denverlibrary.org

1990 deaths
1893 births
American female equestrians
First Ladies and Gentlemen of Guam
First Ladies of American Samoa
People from Denver